The Ogan River is a river in South Sumatra, Indonesia. It is a tributary of the Musi River in Southern Sumatra. Flowing entirely in the South Sumatra province, it rises in Barisan Mountains (Bukit Barisan) and meanders slowly eastwards to join the Musi River at Kertapati, Palembang. The Ogan ranks as the third longest river in South Sumatra (behind Musi and Komering). The river either borders or cuts through the regency of South OKU, OKU, OKI, and Ogan Ilir.

The Ogan and Pegagan tribes lived along the Ogan and its tributaries. Most were peasant or merchant. The river served first as vital transportation artery and communications link. Formed from thick layers of this river's silt deposits, the Ogan River Valley is one of the most fertile agricultural regions of the province.

Geography
The river flows in the southern area of Sumatra with predominantly tropical rainforest climate (designated as Af in the Köppen–Geiger climate classification). The annual average temperature in the area is 24 °C. The warmest month is October, when the average temperature is around 26 °C, and the coldest is January, at 22 °C. The average annual rainfall is 2902 mm. The wettest month is November, with an average of 435 mm rainfall, and the driest is August, with 83 mm rainfall.

See also
List of rivers of Indonesia
List of rivers of Sumatra

References

Rivers of South Sumatra
Rivers of Indonesia